César Fiaschi (1891–1954) was an Argentine film actor.

Selected filmography
 Twelve Women (1939)
 My Country's Wings (1939)
 Seven Women (1944)
 His Best Student (1944)
 Saint Candida (1945)
 The Three Musketeers (1946)
 The Guitar of Gardel (1949)
 The Black Market (1953)

References

Bibliography
 Finkielman, Jorge. The Film Industry in Argentina: An Illustrated Cultural History. McFarland, 24 Dec 2003.

External links
 

1891 births
1954 deaths
Argentine male film actors
People from Buenos Aires